Taaibos Lifestyle Estate is a new developing estate in the Free State province of South Africa and part of the Metsimaholo Local Municipality.

Taaibos Lifestyle Estate is a former coal-mining village located between Sasolburg and Heilbron, and is home to two decommissioned power stations, Taaibos and Highveld, inactive since 1994.
Directly translated from Afrikaans to English, the name literally means "power source".

References

Populated places in the Metsimaholo Local Municipality